Walter Trumbull is the name of:
Walter Trumbull, American explorer
Walter H. Trumbull, American football player
Walter S. Trumbull, American sportswriter